The Amphibious Assault Ship Project was a proposed procurement project by the Government of Canada for the Royal Canadian Navy (RCN). However, no such project was incorporated into the Government's defence plan Strong, Secure and Engaged released in 2017 and cost challenges with other naval procurement projects under the National Shipbuilding Procurement Strategy has led to no movement on the idea.

This idea came about as part of the development of the Joint Support Ship Project of the Royal Canadian Navy and the need to improve the strategic sealift and amphibious assault capability of the Canadian Forces. Many of the capabilities required for strategic sealift were to be included in the Joint Support Ship Project, however, a dedicated amphibious assault ship was favoured by some, such as then Chief of the Defence Staff Rick Hillier.

By late 2008, the project appeared to have been placed on hold, if not cancelled. By 2013 the project was again being discussed as the result of a proposal made by the Thales (DCNS) to provide the  design. In mid-2014, both DCNS and SNC Lavalin offered three ships at a cost CAD$2.6 billion (2 billion euro). SNC Lavalin proposed to construct the vessels, while DCNS would design them and STX France would consolidate the hulls for arctic operations. The Royal Canadian Navy also trained with the French Navy on a Thales-built amphibious assault ship. However, the project was abandoned due to budget constraints.

Background
In 2005 Chief of Defence Staff, General Rick Hillier and Director of Maritime Requirements, Captain (N) Peter Ellis told the Standing Committee on National Defence in the House of Commons that the Canadian Forces required strategic sealift capacity for operations in the 21st century. The Minister of National Defence at that time, David Pratt, was directly involved in several major procurement projects totaling $7.0 billion including the Joint Support Ship Project and what became the Amphibious Assault Ship Project, declaring that in the next decade the Canadian Forces must expect to engage in the sort of operations it has experienced over the past decade.

Concept
According to the Direction générale de l'Armement (DGA), as well as the French newspaper La Tribune, the Royal Canadian Navy had shown "strong interest" in purchasing two Mistral-class amphibious assault ships from France.  A Mistral-class ship can carry a significantly large military force with equipment and vehicles in "fighting order", enabling the Canadian Forces to face armed opposition ashore.

As conceived, the Amphibious Assault Ship Project envisioned a ship that could carry personnel and equipment that could rapidly disembark in waves using landing craft and/or helicopters such as the CH-47 Chinook. The ship would be able to disembark personnel and equipment, and support to them in the face of armed opposition. The warship could also be used in support of humanitarian operations since it would have a large hospital on board designed for treating combat casualties. The ship will be able to carry a battalion-size able to conduct noncombatant evacuation operation around the world.

The Canadian Alliance Party had issued a call for procuring four "support / amphibious ships, at least one dedicated helicopter / light carrier". First considered in the year 2000, whether the Amphibious Assault Ship Project ever made it to the design stage is still unclear. The Royal Canadian Military Institute had proposed to obtain four ships similar to the British .

Aircraft
As with any amphibious assault ship, a possible Canadian amphibious assault ship would be expected to carry a number of transport helicopters as well as aircraft for possible offensive and defensive roles. The staff of the Canadian Forces had requested that the ship be capable of carrying a minimum of six attack helicopters along with seventeen medium helicopters or 12 heavy-lift helicopters. In 2003, Major General (ret.) Lewis MacKenzie declared that Canada must consider buying the aircraft carrier-capable version of the F-35 Lightning II.

Mistral-class concept rejection
In 2014 the Department of Defence looked at the possibility of acquiring two already complete Mistral-class amphibious assault ships from France. These vessels had been originally ordered by Russia in 2010 but the delivery was halted following the illegal annexation and occupation of Crimea by Russia. As a result France began looking for other potential buyers including Canada and Egypt. After an examination process and several training cruises on the vessels, in 2015 the Deputy Defence Minister John Forster advised Defence Minister Jason Kenney not to go ahead with the purchase. Forster cited how the purchase and operating costs of the vessels would stress resources on the already over budget $39 billion National Shipbuilding Procurement Strategy. Due to the negative impact it would have on the construction on other vessels needed to replace Canada's aging surface combat fleet, the Department of National Defence withdrew interest in purchasing the vessels.

See also
 Joint Support Ship Project
 Marine Commando Regiment
 List of amphibious warfare ships

References

External links
 DND show an interest in the French design

Proposed ships of the Royal Canadian Navy
Canadian defence procurement